WWSN (92.5 FM), known as "Sunny 92.5", is a radio station located in Newaygo, Michigan, owned by Cumulus Media. It transmits on a frequency of 92.5 Megahertz. From 2006 to 2019, the format was country music as WLAW.

Before playing its previous country format, the frequency was used to simulcast sister stations WKLQ and WLAV.

The station's transmitter is located on the same tower as sister station WHTS. The tower is owned by WZZM-TV.

On August 15, 2014, WLAW became one of the first stations to join the "Nash Icon" network as 92.5 Nash Icon. With the change, 92.5 kept part of the classic country artists, but added more music from newer country artists.

On April 1, 2019, the WLAW call sign and its "Nash Icon" country format moved to 97.5 FM Whitehall, swapping frequencies with adult contemporary-formatted WWSN, which moved to 92.5 FM Newaygo.

Former logos

References

Michiguide.com - WLAW History

External links

WSN (FM)
Mainstream adult contemporary radio stations in the United States
Cumulus Media radio stations
Radio stations established in 2006
2006 establishments in Michigan